The river Arasalar is a river that flows through Tamil Nadu and Pudducherry, and a tributary of Kaveri river which splits into 5 different rivers when it enters into Thanjavur district from Trichy. It separates from river Kaveri in the place near Pullambadi where the Kaveri is stopped by Lower Anaicut and from Thiruvaiyaru. The river is one of the seven rivers that run in the Karaikal region of Puducherry.

River pollution 
Findings of Central Pollution Control Board had revealed that the river is polluted by high concentrations of nitrate and chromium due to mixing of sewage water into the river stream and industrial activities in 2013. The river has the highest arsenic concentration among all rivers in India (13.33 µg/L at Porakudi).

River course 
The river takes is course from Thiruvaiyaru of Thanjavur where it branches from Kaveri, travels through Kumbakonam. It runs a distance of 11.2 km before emptying itself into the sea of Bay of Bengal at Karaikal, east of Akalanganni. The river forms the natural boundary line separating Neravy from Thirunallar on the north-west and Karaikal on the north-east. The river also feeds other smaller rivers such as Nattar, Vanjiar and Nular.

Karaikal once served as a river port till 19th century where the yachts and Marakkalam ships of Karaikal Marakkayar harboured in and, loaded and unloaded the goods towards exports and imports. The dockyard by name "HMTS Pandagasalai" that is situated 2 km from the Sea Shore stands as an evidence for the same to proclaim that Karaikal was once a traditional River Port through the River Arasalar. From this River port Karaikal got connected with Siam ( Now 'Thailand'), south east and far-east Asian countries, Middle East and African Countries in its tradeline.

The historical Novel by name "Ponniyin Selvan" that describes the life of Rajaraja Chola, written and scripted by the Tamil writer Shri. Amarar Kalki speaks a lot about Arasalar.

References 

Rivers of Puducherry
Rivers of Tamil Nadu
Rivers of India